Morwenna Talling (born 29 September 2002) is an English rugby union player. She is a member of the England women's national rugby union team and plays for Loughborough Lightning in the Premier 15s.

International career

Talling made her debut for England against Italy in November 2020 during the Six Nations tournament. In September 2022 she was named in the England squad for the COVID-delayed 2021 Rugby World Cup.

Club career 

In September 2019 Talling moved to Leicestershire to study for A-levels at Loughborough College and made her debut for Loughborough Lightning the following month.

Early life and education 

Talling grew up in Ryedale, where she played for Malton and Norton RUFC as well captaining the North of England and Yorkshire girls' rugby union teams and representing Scarborough and District at hockey, netball, cross-country and athletics.

References 

Living people
2002 births
England women's international rugby union players
English female rugby union players